Sardab River is a river in Mazandaran Province of northern Iran

The river flows northwards, through the Central Alborz mountain range.

It is a tributary of the Chaloos River, which flows into the Caspian Sea.

Central Alborz mountain range map

Rivers of Mazandaran Province
Alborz (mountain range)
Tributaries of the Chalus River